Joe Pritchard is a footballer who played for Tranmere Rovers and Ellesmere Port. He scored 29 goals in 178 appearances for Tranmere, before moving to Ellesmere Port in June 1970. He was later employed as a joiner in Cammell Laird shipyard.

References

Tranmere Rovers F.C. players
Ellesmere Port Town F.C. players
1943 births
Living people
Sportspeople from Birkenhead
Association football midfielders
English footballers
Liverpool F.C. players
English Football League players